The 1906 TCU football team represented Texas Christian University (TCU) as an independent during the 1906 college football season. Led by Emory J. Hyde in his second year as head coach, TCU compiled a record of 2–5. They played their home games in Waco, Texas.

Schedule

References

TCU
TCU Horned Frogs football seasons
TCU football